North Coast is an album by the Cleveland based Michael Stanley Band which was released in 1981. It reached No. 79 on the Billboard charts and included the hit Falling in Love Again which reached No. 64 on the Billboard hot singles list. It was the second album for the group on EMI America. The album's title refers to Cleveland, Ohio's "North Coast", which is the city's lakefront district. Stanley also used the term to portray Cleveland as its own "coast," separate from the East Coast and West Coast of the U.S.

Album origin
Following the success of Heartland, the band gathered at the Suma Recording studios in Cleveland, Ohio to record another collection of "solid rock" tunes, as Stanley  put it. The album was produced by Eddie Kramer, who worked with the Beatles, the Rolling Stones, Led Zeppelin, KISS, and the Jimi Hendrix Experience, and was mixed at the Electric Lady Studios in Greenwich Village, New York City. Reviewers and Stanley himself claimed the album best approximated how the band sounds when it is performing in concert.

The songs
The album opens with In the Heartland, Stanley's ode to the life of a typical midwestern American. This was also a nod to the band's previous album, Heartland. This was followed by keyboardist Kevin Raleigh's When Your Heart Says It's Right, Stanley/Pelander's Somewhere in the Night, and Stanley's Heaven and Hell, all of which became standards at the band's performances for sold out crowds in the midwest states. One of the most ambitious tracks on the record was the New Wave-sounding Chemistry. The sole hit was "Falling in Love Again" written by Michael Stanley and keyboardist Bob Pelander. It reached No. 64 on the Billboard charts. The B-side was "Does It Hurt". The album concludes with another blue-collar rock anthem, "Let's Hear It."

Weekly charts

Track listing

Personnel
 Michael Stanley – guitar, vocals
 Gary Markasky – lead guitar
 Kevin Raleigh – keyboards, vocals
 Michael Gismondi – bass guitar
 Tommy Dobeck – drums
 Bob Pelander – keyboards, vocals
 Rick Bell – saxophone

References

Michael Stanley Band albums
1981 albums
Albums produced by Eddie Kramer
EMI America Records albums